Tõrva is a town in Tõrva Parish, Valga County, southern Estonia. It is situated on the banks of Õhne River.

Tõrva borough gained its town rights on 2 July 1926.

The last mayor Maido Ruusmann was elected on 5 November 2013.

International relations

Twin towns — Sister cities
The former municipality of Tõrva was twinned with:

Gallery

References

External links

Cities and towns in Estonia
Former municipalities of Estonia
Populated places in Valga County
Tõrva Parish